This is a discography of the British duo Chas & Dave. Included are single and album releases and their UK chart peaks.

Singles

Albums

Participations
 1982 : Billy King – Wake Up Little Suzie (Single, Minstrel)
 1983 : Eric Clapton - Odds and Sods (Album, Beano)
 1983 : Clarence 'Frogman' Henry – That Old Piano (Single, Rockney)
 1986 : The TV Hits Album Two - Crackerjack (Album, Towerbell Records)
 2010 : Jools Holland & His Rhythm & Blues Orchestra – Rockinghorse (Album, Rhino Records)

References

Discographies of British artists